Lysidice is a genus of polychaete worms in the family Eunicidae.

References

External links

Polychaete genera
Errantia